Beloved is a 1965 Soviet romance film directed by Richard Viktorov.

Plot 
The film tells about a girl named Ira, who planned to go to college, but after meeting the builder she decided that she would work at a construction site, where she began to conflict with colleagues who did not like her personal qualities.

Cast 
 Aleksandra Nazarova as Ira Yegorova
 Vitali Solomin as Volodya Levadov
 Igor Dobrolyubov as Rostik
 Svetlana Druzhinina as Sofya
 Vyacheslav Brovkin as Dementiy Pavlovich Blyakhin (as V. Brovkin)
 Boris Platonov as Ivan Yegorovich
 Yelena Maksimova as Nina Petrovna
 Aleksey Baranovsky as Bit-Part
 Anna Dubrovina as Ksyusha
 Roman Filippov as Loader

References

External links 
 

1965 films
1960s Russian-language films
Soviet romance films
1960s romance films
Soviet black-and-white films
Soviet teen films